Lenteng Agung Station (LNA), is a railway station located on Jl. Lenteng Agung Timur, Lenteng Agung, Jagakarsa, South Jakarta. The station, which is located at an altitude of +57 meters, is included in the Jakarta Operational Area I and only serves the KRL Commuterline route. Similar to Lebakjero Station in West Java, the tracks at this station is curved, forming an S curve.

Building and layout 
Lenteng Agung Station has two railway lines. Line 1 is a straight line towards Manggarai, while line 2 is a straight line towards Citayam. This station has two side platforms.

Services
The following is a list of train services at the Lenteng Agung Station

Passenger services 
 KAI Commuter

Supporting transportation

References

External links

South Jakarta
Railway stations in Jakarta